The Strange Little Birds Tour was the seventh concert tour by American rock band Garbage, in support of their sixth studio album, Strange Little Birds (2016). The tour began on May 16, 2016, in Irvine, California, and ended on December 17, 2016, in Lima, Peru.

Garbage's touring line-up is augmented by Eric Avery on bass guitar. Due to illness, Butch Vig was replaced by Matt Walker for European and North American shows at the start of the run and later Eric Gardner. Garbage have been supported by a number of hand-picked opening acts on this tour; including Tiny Little Houses, Olympia, Tash Sultana, The Pearl Harts, Kristin Kontrol and Cigarettes After Sex.

Tour dates

Cancelled shows

Setlist

The tour set list omits less well known songs for festival appearances. Songs introduced during the run include "So Like A Rose" (from Beautiful Garbage) performed in both London and St. Louis as a tribute to "Blood For Poppies" music video director Matt Irwin. At the beginning of July, debut album track "Supervixen" was added to the set, along with "Shut Your Mouth", while "Subhuman", "Queer", "Milk", "Androgyny" and "Beloved Freak" returned to the set on occasion over the following two months. During September, Strange Little Birds tracks "Night Drive Loneliness" and "Magnetized" were performed in concert, "So We Can Stay Alive" has also been sound-checked.

During this tour, Shirley has been quoting lines from the Beyoncé songs "Sorry" and "Don't Hurt Yourself" alongside lyrics from Marianne Faithfull's "Why D'Ya Do It", Patti Smith Group's "Revenge" and Siouxsie and the Banshees' "Drop Dead/Celebration" on "Vow". In addition to interpolating from "Talk of the Town" by The Pretenders on "Special", Shirley has also quoted lines from their song "Kid" and their cover of "I Go to Sleep".

References

2016 concert tours
Concert tours of Australia
Concert tours of Canada
Concert tours of France
Concert tours of Germany
Concert tours of Mexico
Concert tours of South America
Concert tours of the United Kingdom
Concert tours of the United States
Garbage (band) concert tours